Grahamville may refer to:

Grahamville, Kentucky, an unincorporated community
Grahamville, South Carolina, an unincorporated community

See also
Grahamsville (disambiguation)